Loyce W. Turner (December 2, 1927 – April 16, 2021) was an American politician in the state of Georgia.

Turner attended Auburn University and the University of Georgia. He served in the United States Army from 1951 to 1953 and was later a farmer and banker. He also worked as veterinarian from 1948 to 1976.

Turner served in the Georgia State Senate from 1975 to 1998, representing District 8 as a Democrat. His tenure also included a stint as majority whip of the Senate. After his senate term, Turner served on the Georgia Board of Natural Resources. He was the founder of the Annette Howell Turner Center for the Arts, in honor of his late wife.

References

1927 births
2021 deaths
Auburn University alumni
University of Georgia alumni
Democratic Party Georgia (U.S. state) state senators
People from Turner County, Georgia
People from Valdosta, Georgia
Military personnel from Georgia (U.S. state)
American veterinarians
Businesspeople from Georgia (U.S. state)
Farmers from Georgia (U.S. state)